Liam Robert Bridcutt (born 8 May 1989) is a professional footballer who plays as a defensive midfielder for Blackpool. Born in England, he represented the Scotland national team.

Bridcutt started his career with Chelsea, but did not make a league appearance for the London club. He was loaned to Yeovil Town, Watford and Stockport County, before moving to Brighton & Hove Albion in 2010. He has since played for Sunderland, Leeds United, and Nottingham Forest.

Club career

Chelsea
Born in Reading, Berkshire, Bridcutt rose through the youth system at Chelsea, and signed a professional contract in the summer of 2007. He signed on loan for Yeovil Town on 8 February 2008 and made his début against Walsall the following day. He then moved to Watford on loan on 27 November 2008, making his début for the club against Doncaster Rovers on 29 November 2008.

On 14 August 2009, Bridcutt moved to Stockport County on loan until January 2010 and was sent off on his début in the 4–2 win at Brighton & Hove Albion. He scored his first professional goal whilst at Stockport during a Football League Trophy game against Port Vale.

Brighton & Hove Albion
On 28 August 2010, Bridcutt signed a five-month contract with League One side Brighton & Hove Albion. On 5 November 2010, he signed a contract extension until the end of the season after impressing Gus Poyet especially against Plymouth Argyle and Peterborough United. Bridcutt scored his first goal in Albion colours in stoppage time of their 4–3 win over Carlisle United. He followed this up with one of the goals in the 4–3 victory against Dagenham & Redbridge which led to Brighton's promotion to the Championship.

Bridcutt's consistent performances in the 2011–12 Championship campaign earned him Brighton's Player of the Season award. Bridcutt's performances in the following 2012–13 Championship campaign earned him his second successive Player of the Season award, becoming the first Brighton player to achieve back-to-back Player of the Season awards since Bobby Zamora.

Sunderland
On 30 January 2014, after weeks of speculation and a transfer request which was subsequently rejected by Brighton, Bridcutt signed a three-and-a-half-year deal with Sunderland, reuniting him with former Brighton head coach Gus Poyet.

Bridcutt signed for an undisclosed fee, believed to be between £3 million and £4 million, and made his Sunderland début in the Tyne–Wear derby in a 3–0 victory over Newcastle United at St James' Park on 1 February.

Leeds United (loan)
Bridcutt moved on loan to Leeds United on 26 November 2015. He made his Leeds debut on 28 November in a 1–0 defeat against Queens Park Rangers. After impressing in the heart of the Leeds midfield, on 5 January 2016, Bridcutt's loan was extended until the end of the 2015–16 season, with the view to a permanent move.

On 13 March 2016, Leeds head coach Steve Evans revealed he wanted to sign Bridcutt permanently at the end of the season.

Despite being at the club for less than a season, on 19 April, Bridcutt was one of five players nominated for the Leeds United Player of the Year Award, alongside Charlie Taylor, Gaetano Berardi, Mirco Antenucci and Lewis Cook. The award was won by Taylor on 30 April.

Leeds United
On 16 August 2016, Bridcutt transferred to Leeds United for an undisclosed fee, signing a two-year contract. His second debut for Leeds came on 20 August in a 2–0 win against Sheffield Wednesday. Bridcutt was appointed team captain, replacing the departed Sol Bamba on 9 September 2016.

Bridcutt picked up an injury on 14 September against Blackburn Rovers and it was revealed that Bridcutt had broken his foot and would miss several months of the season as a result of the injury. Bridcutt returned from injury on 13 December replacing an injured Chris Wood as a first-half substitute in a 2–0 win against Reading.

At the start of the 2017–18 season, Leeds manager Thomas Christiansen named Liam Cooper captain, replacing Bridcutt.

Nottingham Forest
On 22 August 2017, Bridcutt joined Championship side Nottingham Forest on a three-year deal for undisclosed fee, thought to be in the region of £1,000,000. He scored his first goal for the club in a 2–1 loss at Cardiff City on 21 April 2018.

Bolton Wanderers (loan)
On 2 September 2019, Bridcutt joined EFL League One side Bolton Wanderers on loan until January and was one of nine players Bolton signed on deadline day. He made his debut on 14 September, starting against Rotherham United in a 6–1 defeat. On 17 September, Bridcutt started captaining Bolton. Bridcutt's loan was ended a few days early by Forest on 1 January 2020.

Lincoln City (loan)
On 31 January 2020, Bridcutt joined Lincoln City on loan for the remainder of the 2020 season. Bridcutt was named captain for the match against Gillingham on 22 February 2020 due to Jason Shackell being dropped from the squad. He continued in his role as Captain as Shackell remained out of the team.

Lincoln City
On 7 August 2020, Bridcutt joined Lincoln City permanently following his expiration of his contract at Nottingham Forest. He would make his first appearance as a permanent member of the team, coming off the bench in a 5-0 win against Bradford City in the EFL Cup second round. It was revealed on 18 May 2022 that he had been offered a new contract at Lincoln City. On the 27 June 2022, Lincoln confirmed that Bridcutt would be leaving the club after two-and-a-half seasons.

Blackpool
On 30 September 2022, Bridcutt signed for Blackpool on a one-year contract with an option for a further year, rejoining his former manager at Lincoln, Michael Appleton.

International career
Bridcutt qualifies to play for Scotland through his Edinburgh-born grandfather. On 7 March 2013, Bridcutt was named in Gordon Strachan's Scotland squad for the 2014 FIFA World Cup qualification matches against Wales and Serbia. He gained his first Scotland cap in the game versus Serbia on 26 March 2013.

After regaining his form whilst at Leeds United, Bridcutt regained his place in the Scotland squad on 10 March 2016 for a friendly against Denmark. He was called up alongside teammate Liam Cooper who made the squad for the first time. On 29 March 2016, Bridcutt played against Denmark in a 1–0 victory, and was subject to heavy criticism from Denmark Manager Age Hareide for a challenge on Denmark defender Erik Sviatchenko which only earned Bricutt a yellow card.

Career statistics

Honours

Brighton & Hove Albion
Football League One: 2010–11

See also
List of Scotland international footballers born outside Scotland

References

External links

1989 births
Living people
Sportspeople from Reading, Berkshire
English footballers
Scottish footballers
Scotland international footballers
Association football midfielders
Chelsea F.C. players
Lincoln City F.C. players
Yeovil Town F.C. players
Watford F.C. players
Stockport County F.C. players
Brighton & Hove Albion F.C. players
Sunderland A.F.C. players
Premier League players
English Football League players
Black British sportsmen
English people of Scottish descent
Leeds United F.C. players
Nottingham Forest F.C. players
Bolton Wanderers F.C. players
Blackpool F.C. players
Footballers from Berkshire